Commander of the Air Force may refer to:
Commander of the Air Force (Egypt)
Commander of the Air Force (Sri Lanka)